Stian Bjørge (born 31 July 1976) is a Norwegian speed skater, born in Skien. He competed in the 5000 m at the 2002 Winter Olympics in Salt Lake City.

References

External links
 

1976 births
Living people
Sportspeople from Skien
Norwegian male speed skaters
Olympic speed skaters of Norway
Speed skaters at the 2002 Winter Olympics
21st-century Norwegian people